A Ritterstein ("Ritter Stone") is the German name given to markers made of  sandstone erected at sites of historic or natural interest in the Palatine Forest, a range of low mountains in the German state of Rhineland-Palatinate.  In some cases, glacial erratics were used, in others, rocks or walls at the site were used on which to carve the information.

The stones are typically inscribed with their name, a suitable symbol, the date they were erected, their height above sea level and the initials PWV for the Pfälzerwald-Verein or Palatine Forest Club, who set up and look after the stones. They are named after chief forester, Karl Albrecht von Ritter (died 1917), the founding chairman of the PWV, who initiated the system in the early 20th century.

References

Literature

External links 

Palatinate Forest
Monuments and memorials in Germany